A number of Korean dialects are spoken on the Korean Peninsula. The peninsula is very mountainous and each dialect's "territory" corresponds closely to the natural boundaries between different geographical regions of Korea. Most of the dialects are named for one of the traditional Eight Provinces of Korea. Two are sufficiently distinct from the others to be considered separate languages, the Jeju and the Yukjin languages.

Dialect areas

[[File:Korean dialect zones (National Atlas of Korea).svg|thumb|upright|Dialect zones in the National Atlas of Korea]]

Korea is a mountainous country, and this could be the main reason why Korean is divided into numerous small local dialects. There are few clear demarcations, so dialect classification is necessarily to some extent arbitrary.
A common classification, originally introduced by Shinpei Ogura in 1944 and adjusted by later authors, identifies six dialect areas:
Hamgyŏng (Northeastern)
Spoken in the Hamgyong Province (Kwanbuk and Kwannam) region, the northeast corner of Pyongan Province, and the Ryanggang Province of North Korea as well as Jilin, Heilongjiang of Northeast China; Russia, Uzbekistan, Kazakhstan of former Soviet Union. Nine vowels: the eight of the standard language plus ö. 
Pyongan (Northwestern)
Spoken in Pyongyang, Pyongan Province, Chagang Province, and neighboring Liaoning, of China. The basis of the standard language for North Korea.
Central dialects
The central dialect refers to a dialect generally used in the surrounding areas of Hwanghae Province, Gangwon Province(Kangwon Province), and Chungcheong Province, centering on Seoul and  Gyeonggi Province. Depending on scholars, it is divided into the Gyeonggi dialect(Central dialect) and Chungcheong dialect from the beginning, or subdivided into Gyeonggi dialect, Gangwon dialect, Hwanghae dialect, and Chungcheong dialect. The central dialect region is very large, so it is not easy to extract features common to all regions. Among its characteristics, it is more difficult to extract the unique characteristics of the central dialect. For example, which dialect has an intonation as a phonological list is very important in the dialect compartment. Most of the central dialects do not have intonations, but they have intonations in Yeongdong, Gangwon Province, as well as Pyeongchang, Jeongseon, and Yeongwol, the surrounding Yeongseo regions. In the case of vocabulary, the difference is so severe that we do not know how many pieces the central dialect will be divided into. Therefore, the characteristics of the central dialect, which correspond to all regions of the central dialect region, are extremely rare, and if there is such a feature, it is easy to be found in other dialects rather than just the central dialect. Therefore, it may be close to the fact that it is the central dialect that combines the remaining dialects except for other dialects where distinct characteristics are observed, rather than having a specific phenomenon observed only in the central dialect. Since the central dialect consists of sub-dialects that are more heterogeneous than other dialects, it is more likely to be divided into several sub-dialects than any other dialect. Usually, it seems that it can be divided into five sub-dialects.
Gyeonggi dialect, also called the "Seoul dialect": spoken in the Gyeonggi Province, Seoul and Incheon cities, as well as in Kaesong, Kaepung and Changpung (North Korea). The basis of the standard language for South Korea. Although it is often called Gyeonggi dialect by combining Gyeonggi dialect and Seoul dialect, Seoul has been the capital of Joseon for more than 500 years, so the Seoul dialect is often classified separately because the royal language is permeated. And, it is sometimes called the Gyeonggi dialect by combining the Gyeonggi dialect and the Yeongseo dialect.
Chungcheong dialect: spoken in the Chungcheong Province (Hoseo) region of South Korea, including the metropolitan city of Daejeon. The dialect of Chungcheong Province is a dialect with the most elements of the Jeolla dialect among the Central dialects, and can also be divided into the other. Some parts of South Chungcheong Province, including Daejeon and Sejong, are classified as southern dialects such as the Jeolla and Gyeongsang dialects.
Yeongseo dialect: spoken in Yeongseo, Gangwon Province (South Korea) and neighboring Kangwon Province (North Korea) to the west of the Taebaek Mountains. Yeongseo is quite distinct from the Yeongdong dialect to the east of the mountains. Unlike the Yeongdong dialect, the Yeongseo dialect has not been studied much because it is almost similar to the Gyeonggi dialect, and scholars often see it as just a part of Gyeonggi dialect.
Yeongdong dialect: spoken in Yeongdong, Gangwon Province (South Korea) and neighboring Kangwon Province (North Korea) to the east of the Taebaek Mountains. Yeongdong is quite distinct from the Central Korean dialects to the west of the mountains. There are many elements of the Gyeongsang dialect, and sometimes the Hamgyŏng dialect is mixed, and it has many characteristics that are not present in the rest of the Central dialect.
Hwanghae dialect: spoken in Hwanghae Province of North Korea. The Hwanghae dialect is a dialect with the most elements of the Pyongan dialect among the Central dialects, and can also be divided into the other. Hwanghae dialect was commonly included among the Central dialects, but some researchers argue that it does not fit there comfortably. Because the division between South Korea and North Korea has prolonged, the Hwanghae dialect has been strongly influenced by the Pyongan dialect, and now more and more people see it as a sub-dialect of the Pyongan dialect, not the Central dialect.
In any case, the central dialect can be said to be a dialect that can vary in various areas of the dialect depending on the criteria for the dialect compartment. For example, Hwanghae, Gyeonggi, Gangwon and Chungcheong are usually grouped together as the Central dialect region. But, many view that only Hwanghae, Gyeonggi, and Gangwon dialects are included in the central dialect, while Chungcheong dialect is considered as separate dialect.
Gyeongsang (Southeastern)
Spoken in Gyeongsang Province (Yeongnam) of South Korea, including the cities of Busan, Daegu and Ulsan. This dialect is easily distinguished from the Seoul dialect because its pitch is more varied. Six vowels, i, e, a, eo, o, u.
Jeolla (Southwestern)
Spoken in the Jeolla Province (Honam) region of South Korea, including the city of Gwangju. Ten vowels: i, e, ae, a, ü, ö, u, o, eu, eo.Jeju
Spoken on Jeju Island off the southwest coast of South Korea and is sometimes considered a separate Koreanic language. The nine vowels of Middle Korean, including arae-a (ɔ). May have additional consonants as well.
Several linguists have suggested that a further dialect area should be split from the Northeastern dialects:
Ryukchin (Yukchin)
Spoken in the historical Yukchin region which is located in the northern part of North Hamgyong Province, far removed from P'yŏng'an, but has more in common with P'yŏng'an dialects than with the surrounding Hamgyŏng dialects. Since it has been isolated from the major changes of Korean language, it has preserved distinct features of Middle Korean. It is the only known tonal Korean language.

A recent statistical analysis of these dialects suggests that the hierarchical structure within these dialects are highly uncertain, meaning that there is no quantitative evidence to support a family-tree-like relationship among them.

Some researchers classify the Korean dialects in Western and Eastern dialects. Compared with Middle Korean, the Western dialects have preserved long vowels, while the Eastern dialects have preserved tones or pitch accent. The Jeju language and some dialects in North Korean make no distinction between vowel length or tone. But the Southeastern dialect and the Northeastern dialect may not be closely related to each other genealogically.

Standard language
 In South Korea, Standard Korean (표준어/標準語/pyojun-eo) is defined by the National Institute of the Korean Language as "the modern speech of Seoul widely used by the well-cultivated". In practice, it tends not to include features that are found exclusively in Seoul.
 In North Korea, the adopting proclamation stated that the Pyongan dialect spoken in the capital of Pyongyang and its surroundings should be the basis for the North Korean standard language (Munhwaŏ''); however, in practice, it remains "firmly rooted" in the Gyeonggi dialect, which had been the national standard for centuries.

Despite North–South differences in the Korean language, the two standards are still broadly intelligible. One notable feature within the divergence is the North's lack of anglicisms and other foreign borrowings due to isolationism and self-reliance—pure/invented Korean words are used in replacement.

Outside of the Korean peninsula 
 Koryo-mar (Autonym: Корё мар/고려말,), usually identified as a descendant of the Hamgyŏng dialect, is spoken by the Koryo-saram, ethnic Koreans in the post-Soviet states of Russia and Central Asia. It consists of a Korean base vocabulary, but takes many loanwords and calques from Russian language. It is mostly based on Hamgyong and Ryukchin dialect, since Koryo-saram people are mainly from the northern part of Hamgyong region.
 Sakhalin Korean Language (사할린 한국어), usually identified as a descendant of the southern dialect, is spoken by the Sakhalin Korean.
 Zainichi Korean language (재일어; 재일조선어) is a language or a dialect spoken among Koreans in Japan, strongly influenced by Japanese.
 Korean language in China (중국조선어) As discussed above, Koreans in China use a dialect nearly identical to Hamgyŏng dialect in North Korea, but there are still some differences, as the former has relatively more loanwords from modern Chinese.

See also
Koreanic languages
Regions of Korea

References

 
 
 
 
  Volume 1: . Volume 2: .
  (preprint)

Further reading

  (text)
 
 
 
 

 
Korean language

pl:Język koreański#Dialekty